Mouzon is a commune in the Ardennes department in northern France. It is situated on the river Meuse. On 1 January 2016, the former commune Amblimont was merged into Mouzon.

Population

The population data in the table and graph below refer to the commune of Mouzon proper, in its geography at the given years. The commune of Mouzon absorbed the former commune of Villemontry in 1965, and Amblimont in 2016.

Notable people
Eugène Charles Miroy (1828-1871), executed French Catholic priest
Raymond Sommer (1906–1950), racing driver

See also
Communes of the Ardennes department
Concordat of Worms

References

Communes of Ardennes (department)
Communes nouvelles of Ardennes
Ardennes communes articles needing translation from French Wikipedia